The Mann Egerton Type H, also known as the Mann Egerton H.2, was a British ship-borne fighter aircraft of the 1910s.

Development
The Type H was the first original design by Mann Egerton, and was designed by J W Carr to Air Ministry specification N.1a in 1916. Its 2-bay biplane wings could be folded manually (a feature first introduced in 1913 on the Short Folder), due to its intended use as a naval fighter. Other features were the use of flotation chambers and a float attached to the underside of the fuselage for extra buoyancy. An innovation was that the undercarriage could be jettisoned if the aircraft needed to land on water. However, in autumn 1917, the aircraft failed flotation tests, and a new aircraft prototype, the Type H Mk I with single bay wings was drawn up.

The Mark II version had inflatable flotation bags in place of the large float on the Mk I, a more conventional undercarriage and a horn-balanced rudder. This aircraft was tested in December 1917, however it was deemed as unfit for use in the Fleet Air Arm and further development was discontinued.

Specifications (Type H Mk II)

References

  
 

1910s British fighter aircraft
Type H
Aircraft first flown in 1917